The 1985–86 NBA season was the SuperSonics' 19th season in the NBA.

The SuperSonics finished the season in eleventh place in the Western Conference with a 31–51 record, the same as the previous year.

Draft picks

Roster

Staff management
 Bob Kloppenburg, Assistant coach
 Lorin Miller, Assistant coach

Salaries

Regular season

Highs 
 Seattle finishes the season on a positive note, defeating the Golden State Warriors on the home.
 Great draft picks like Xavier McDaniel.
 Tom Chambers' strong shot and high-flying dunks.
 Went on a 3-game winning streak between November 22 - 26.

Lows 
 Seattle would lose their first 3 games.
 Losing streaks of 3 to 6 games.
 On November 8, 1985, the Sonics play the Portland Trail Blazers, a familiar rival dubbed as the "I-5 Rivalry". The game is held at Memorial Coliseum in Portland. The Trail Blazers win the game by a score of 92–88.

Season standings

z - clinched division title
y - clinched division title
x - clinched playoff spot

Record vs. opponents

Game log

Player statistics

Awards and records
 Xavier McDaniel, All-Rookie 1st Team

References

See also
 1985-86 NBA season

Seattle SuperSonics seasons
Sea